Mihaela Gheorghiu (born 5 November 1971) is a Romanian athlete. She competed in the women's long jump at the 1996 Summer Olympics.

References

1971 births
Living people
Athletes (track and field) at the 1996 Summer Olympics
Romanian female long jumpers
Olympic athletes of Romania
Place of birth missing (living people)